First Encounter is an album by American jazz pianist Mal Waldron and bassist Gary Peacock recorded in 1971 and released on the Japanese RCA Victor label.

Reception
The Allmusic review by Scott Yanow awarded the album 3 stars stating "The long improvisations on the four originals (three by Waldron and one from Peacock) are melancholy, usually introverted and subtle. The interplay between Waldron and Peacock on the inside/outside music is the main asset to this obscure but generally rewarding session".

Track listing
All compositions by Mal Waldron except where noted.
 "She Walks In Beauty" — 12:18  
 "The Heart Of The Matter" — 11:56  
 "What's That" (Gary Peacock) — 9:05  
 "Walking Way" — 13:00

Personnel
 Mal Waldron — piano 
 Gary Peacock — bass
 Hiroshi Murakami — drums

References

RCA Victor albums
Mal Waldron albums
Gary Peacock albums
1971 albums
Catalyst Records (jazz) albums